Pudding Butte is a butte in Antarctica, standing 2 nautical miles (3.7 km) southwest of Beta Peak, in the Prince Albert Mountains, Oates Land, close to the boundary with Victoria Land.

Named by the Southern Part] of the New Zealand Geological Survey Antarctic Expedition (NZGSAE), 1962–63, because of a splendid feast at the nearby camp.

Buttes of Antarctica
Prince Albert Mountains
Mountains of Oates Land